Shoreacres is a city located in Harris County in the U.S. state of Texas alongside State Highway 146. Established with a mayor-alderman form of city government, it was incorporated in 1949. The population was 1,566 at the 2020 census.

Geography

Shoreacres is located at  (29.620395, –95.016710).

Demographics

As of the 2020 United States census, there were 1,566 people, 570 households, and 366 families residing in the city.

As of the census of 2000, there were 1,488 people, 559 households, and 455 families residing in the city. The population density was 1,656.1 people per square mile (638.4/km). There were 594 housing units at an average density of 661.1 per square mile (254.8/km). The racial makeup of the city was 94.15% White, 1.01% African American, 0.07% Native American, 0.94% Asian, 0.07% Pacific Islander, 2.96% from other races, and 0.81% from two or more races. Hispanic or Latino of any race were 7.66% of the population.

There were 559 households, out of which 32.2% had children under the age of 18 living with them, 72.1% were married couples living together, 5.9% had a female householder with no husband present, and 18.6% were non-families. 15.6% of all households were made up of individuals, and 7.3% had someone living alone who was 65 years of age or older. The average household size was 2.66 and the average family size was 2.96.

In the city, the population was spread out, with 23.9% under the age of 18, 6.0% from 18 to 24, 28.2% from 25 to 44, 30.4% from 45 to 64, and 11.4% who were 65 years of age or older. The median age was 41 years. For every 100 females, there were 102.2 males. For every 100 females age 18 and over, there were 100.4 males.

The median income for a household in the city was $71,985, and the median income for a family was $75,941. Males had a median income of $51,523 versus $31,389 for females. The per capita income for the city was $29,370. About 1.1% of families and 1.8% of the population were below the poverty line, including 0.5% of those under age 18 and 2.8% of those age 65 or over.

Education

Shoreacres is within the La Porte Independent School District and is zoned to: Bayshore Elementary School, La Porte Junior High School, and La Porte High School.

Residents of La Porte ISD (and therefore Shoreacres) are zoned to San Jacinto College.

Government
Shoreacres is governed by a five-member City Council under the city manager form of government as adopted under ORDINANCE No. 2017-266 that was approved by city council June 12, 2017. The current City Manager is Troy D. Harrison, Sr.. The current Mayor is David Jennings (term ends 2020). Council  consists of five at-large Alderpersons including Mayor Pro-Tempore Ricky Bowles (term ends 2020), Bo Bunker (term ends 2021), Jerome McKown (term ends 2019), Neil Moyer (term ends 2020) and Felicia Ramos (term ends 2021). Council members serve staggered two-year terms.

The city provides police, recycling, parks, planning, zoning, floodplain management, and building code inspections among its services. The city provides fire, sanitation, and emergency medical services by contract.

Harris Health System (formerly Harris County Hospital District) designated Strawberry Health Center in Pasadena for ZIP code 77571. The nearest public hospital is Ben Taub General Hospital in the Texas Medical Center.

Effects of Hurricane Ike, 2008

On September 13, Hurricane Ike made landfall near Galveston.  88 percent of the homes in Shoreacres suffered flood damage.  No local deaths were reported.

Transportation
Harris County Transit operates public transportation.

See also

History of the Galveston Bay Area

References

External links
 City of Shoreacres official website

 

Cities in Chambers County, Texas
Cities in Harris County, Texas
Cities in Texas
Greater Houston
Galveston Bay Area
Populated coastal places in Texas